"The Tale of How Ivan Ivanovich Quarreled with Ivan Nikiforovich" (1835), also known in English as The Squabble, is the final tale in the Mirgorod collection by Nikolai Gogol. It is known as one of his most humorous stories.

In March 2002, the BBC Radio 4 comedy series Three Ivans, Two Aunts and an Overcoat adapted the story under the title "The Two Ivans" starring Griff Rhys Jones and Stephen Moore.

Plot summary

This story takes place in a bucolic small town of Mirgorod (Myrhorod in Ukrainian), written in the style featuring grotesque, realistic portrayals of the characters.  The two Ivans are gentlemen landowners, neighbors and great friends, each one almost being the opposite image of the other. Ivan Ivanovich is tall, thin, and well-spoken, for example, while Ivan Nikiforovich is short, fat, and cuts to the point with a biting honesty.

One day, Ivan Ivanovich (Ivanovich, as well as Nikiforovich, is a patronymic, not a surname) notices his friend's servant hanging some clothes out to dry as well as some military implements, especially a Turkish rifle that interests him.  He goes over to Nikiforovich's house and offers to trade a brown pig and two sacks of oats for it, but his friend is unwilling to part with it and calls Ivan Ivanovich a goose, which terribly offends him. After this, they begin to hate each other.

Nikiforovich erects a goose pen with two posts resting on Ivanovich's property, as if to rub in the insult. To retaliate, Ivan Ivanovich saws the legs off in the night and then fears that his former friend is going to burn his house down.  Eventually, Ivan Ivanovich goes to the courts with a petition to have Ivan Nikiforovich arrested for his slander. The judge cannot believe what is occurring and tries to convince him to make amends, but he disregards their suggestions and leaves the courthouse.

Shortly after this, Ivan Nikiforovich comes into the court with his own petition, to the amazement of those gathered there. Strangely enough, shortly after Ivan Nikiforovich leaves, the petition is stolen and destroyed by the brown pig belonging to Ivan Ivanovich.  The police chief's attempt to have the pig arrested and to convince Ivanovich to reconcile with his friend is unsuccessful.  Because of the pig a new petition is filed, which is quickly duplicated and filed within a day, but sits in the archives for a few years. 

Eventually, the chief of police has a party that Ivan Ivanovich is attending, but his old friend does not, because neither will go anywhere where the other is present.  The party guest Anton Prokofievich goes to Ivan Nikiforovich's house to convince him to come, unknown to the other Ivan. When he convinces him, he sits down to dinner and both Ivans notice each other sitting across the table and the party grows silent. However, they continue eating with nothing occurring. At the end of dinner both try to leave without the other noticing, and some of the party members push them towards each other so they make up. They begin to, but Nikiforovich mentions the word "goose" again, and Ivanovich storms out of the house.

The narrator returns to Mirgorod many years later and sees the two Ivans again, completely worn out. Each is convinced that their case will be concluded in his favour the following day, and the narrator shakes his head in pity and leaves, stating: "It is a depressing world, gentlemen!"

Adaptions

The 2002 BBC Radio 4 adaptation with Griff Rhys Jones ends with the two Ivans agreeing to fight a duel. Ivan Ivanovich, as the challenged party, has the choice of weapons, so he chooses the Turkish rifle, but the duel degenerates into a struggle for the rifle. It goes off in the struggle, having been overloaded with gunpowder, and the two Ivans are killed. They both go to Heaven, but upon seeing Ivan Ivanovich's outspread wings Ivan Nikiforovich again calls him "a goose", which sets off the squabble all over again.

The story was adapted into a Marathi movie titled Katha Don Ganpatravanchi in 1996. The movie was directed by Arun Khopkar and dialogues are written by Satish Alekar. The movie had Dilip Prabhawalkar and Mohan Agashe in lead roles.

References

External links
 

Short stories by Nikolai Gogol
Comic short stories
1835 short stories
Short stories set in the Russian Empire